Bones is a 2010 drama film directed by Frank Pestarino and starring Jimmy Bennett, Melissa Ordway, Zakk Wylde, Jonna Walsh, and Jesse James. Filming began in Hawaiian Gardens.

Production
The film is directed by Frank Pestarino. It was filmed in Hawaiian Gardens. It premiered on March 31, 2010.

Cast
Jimmy Bennett – Bones White
Zakk Wylde – Jed, Bones' uncle
Jonna Walsh – Kelly Reeves
Melissa Ordway – Samantha Reeves
Jesse James – Derrick Scott, Samantha's boyfriend
Andrew Lawrence – Anthony
Robin Thomas – Detective Pino

External links
 
 

2010 films
2010 drama films
American drama films
Films shot in New York (state)
2010s English-language films
2010s American films